Contradusta bregeriana is a species of sea snail, a cowry, a marine gastropod mollusk in the family Cypraeidae, the cowries. 

Subspecies Contradusta bregeriana pervelata (Lorenz, 2002) (taxon inquirendum)

References

 Lorenz, F., 2002. New worldwide cowries. Descriptions of new taxa and revisions of selected groups of living Cypraeidae (Mollusca: Gastropoda). Schriften zur Malakozoologie 20: 292 pp

External links
 On-line articles with Cypraea bregeriana in the HAWAIIAN SHELL NEWS (1960-1994)

Cypraeidae
Gastropods described in 1868